Dino Zucchi (5 December 1927 – 11 October 2011) was an Italian basketball player. He competed in the men's tournament at the 1952 Summer Olympics.

References

1927 births
2011 deaths
Italian men's basketball players
Olympic basketball players of Italy
Basketball players at the 1952 Summer Olympics
Sportspeople from the Province of Modena